The province of Central Sulawesi (Sulawesi Tengah) in Indonesia is divided into twelve regencies (kabupaten) and one city (kota), which together are subdivided in turn administratively into 175 districts (kecamatan).

The districts of Central Sulawesi, with the regency or city each falls into, are as follows:

Ampana Kota, Tojo Una-Una
Ampana Tete, Tojo Una-Una
Ampibabo, Parigi Moutong
Bahodopi, Morowali
Balaesang, Donggala
Balaesang Tanjung, Donggala 
Balantak, Banggai
Balantak Selatan, Banggai 
Balantak Utara, Banggai 
Balinggi, Parigi Moutong 
Banawa, Donggala 
Banawa Selatan, Donggala 
Banawa Tengah, Donggala 
Banggai, Banggai Kepulauan
Baolan, Toli-Toli
Basidondo, Toli-Toli
Batui, Banggai
Batui Selatan, Banggai 
Batudaka, Tojo Una-Una 
Biau, Buol
Boalemo, Banggai
Bokan Kepulauan, Banggai Kepulauan
Bokat, Buol
Bolano, Parigi Moutong 
Bolano Lambunu, Parigi Moutong
Bualemo, Banggai 
Bukal, Buol
Buko, Banggai Kepulauan
Bulagi Selatan, Banggai Kepulauan
Bulagi, Banggai Kepulauan
Bumi Raya, Morowali
Bungku Barat, Morowali
Bungku Selatan, Morowali
Bungku Tengah, Morowali
Bungku Utara, Morowali
Bunobogu, Buol
Bunta, Banggai
Dampal Selatan, Toli-Toli
Dampal Utara, Toli-Toli
Damsol, Donggala 
Dolo Barat, Sigi
Dolo Selatan, Sigi
Dolo, Sigi
Dondo, Toli-Toli
Gadung, Buol
Galang, Toli-Toli
Gumbasa, Sigi
Kasimbar, Parigi Moutong
Kinovaro, Sigi
Kintom, Banggai
Kulawi Selatan, Sigi
Kulawi, Sigi
Labuan, Donggala 
Lage, Poso
Lamala, Banggai
Lampasio, Toli-Toli
Lembo, Morowali
Liang, Banggai Kepulauan
Lindu, Sigi
Lipunoto, Buol
Lo Bangkurung, Banggai Kepulauan
Lobu, Banggai 
Lore Selatan, Poso
Lore Tengah, Poso
Lore Utara, Poso
Lore Timur, Poso 
Lore Peore, Poso 
Luwuk, Banggai
Luwuk Selatan, Banggai 
Luwuk Timur, Banggai 
Mamosalato, Morowali
Mantoh, Banggai 
Marawola Barat, Sigi
Marawola, Sigi

Masama, Banggai 
Menui Kepulauan, Morowali
Mepanga, Parigi Moutong
Momunu, Buol
Moiling, Banggai 
Mori Atas, Morowali
Moutong, Parigi Moutong
Nambo, Banggai 
Nokilalaki, Sigi
Nuhon, Banggai 
Ogo Deide, Toli-Toli
Ongka Malino, Parigi Moutong 
Pagimana, Banggai
Paleleh, Buol
Palasa, Parigi Moutong 
Palolo, Sigi
Palu Barat, Palu
Palu Selatan, Palu
Palu Timur, Palu
Palu Utara, Palu
Pamona Selatan, Poso
Pamona Timur, Poso
Pamona Utara, Poso
Parigi, Parigi Moutong
Parigi Barat, Parigi Moutong 
Parigi Selatan, Parigi Moutong 
Parigi Tengah, Parigi Moutong 
Parigi Utara, Parigi Moutong 
Petasia, Morowali
Pipikoro, Sigi
Pinembani, Donggala 
Poso Kota, Poso
Poso Kota Utara, Poso
Poso Kota Selatan, Poso
Poso Pesisir, Poso
Poso Pesisir Selatan, Poso 
Poso Pesisir Utara, Poso 
Ratulindo, Tojo Una-Una 
Riopakawa, Donggala
Sausu, Parigi Moutong
Sidoan, Parigi Moutong 
Sigi Biromaru, Sigi
Sindue, Donggala
Sindue Tombusabora, Donggala 
Sindue Tobata, Donggala 
Sirenja, Donggala
Siniu, Parigi Moutong 
Sojol, Donggala
North Sojol, Donggala 
Soyo Jaya, Morowali
Talatako, Tojo Una-Una 
Tanambulawa, Sigi
Tanantovea, Donggala 
Taopa, Parigi Moutong 
Tawaeli, Donggala
Tinangkung, Banggai Kepulauan
Tinombo Selatan, Parigi Moutong
Tinombo, Parigi Moutong
Tiolan, Buol
Togean, Tojo Una-Una
Toili, Banggai
Toili Barat, Banggai 
Tojo Barat, Tojo Una-Una
Tojo, Tojo Una-Una
Tomini, Parigi Moutong
Toribulu, Parigi Moutong
Torue, Parigi Moutong
Totikum, Banggai Kepulauan
Ulu Bongka, Tojo Una-Una
Una-Una, Tojo Una-Una
Utara Toli-Toli, Toli-Toli
Walea Besar, Tojo Una-Una 
Walea Kepulauan, Tojo Una-Una
Wita Ponda, Morowali

 
Central Sulawesi

id:Kategori:Kecamatan di Sulawesi Tengah